The 2011 Christy Ring Cup final was a hurling match played at Croke Park on 4 June 2011 to determine the winners of the 2011 Christy Ring Cup, the 7th season of the Christy Ring Cup, a tournament organised by the Gaelic Athletic Association for the second tier hurling teams. The final was contested by Kerry of Munster and Wicklow of Leinster, with Kerry winning by 2-21 to 2-8.

The Christy Ring Cup final between Kerry and Wicklow was the third championship meeting between the two teams, with both sides claiming a victory each and one draw. Kerry were appearing in their second consecutive cup final, however, they had yet to claim the title. Wicklow were appearing in their very first decider.

Kerry imposed themselves on the game early on, opening out a 1-3 to 0-1 lead in the opening 10 minutes. Shane Nolan, Darragh O'Connell and Mike Conway all steered over points, and John Egan hit the game’s opening goal. Wicklow battled their way into the game, and points from Andy O'Brien and Ronan Keddy narrowed the deficit. They were awarded a penalty, but Jonathan O'Neill’s effort was deflected around the post. Kerry hit the last four points of the half to lead by 1-10 to 0-6 at the break.

O’Connell burst through a gap in the Garden defence for a superb goal two minutes after the restart, but the score was cancelled out almost immediately. Wicklow were awarded a second penalty, taken by substitute James Quirke, whose strike was kept out, but he followed in to hammer the rebound home. As the game wore on Wicklow went for goal, without success, when points were there for the taking. Kerry, on the other hand, were able to pick off scores and stretched the lead, before Wicklow pulled back a consolation goal through skipper O’Neill three minutes from the end.

Kerry's Christy Ring Cup victory was their first ever. They became the fourth team to win the Christy Ring Cup. They remain one of only two teams to have won the All-Ireland title and the Christy Ring Cup.

Wicklow's Christy Ring Cup defeat was the first of consecutive cup final defeats. They remain a team who has contested cup finals but has never claimed the ultimate prize.

Match

Details

References

Christy Ring Cup Final
Christy Ring Cup Finals
Kerry GAA matches
Wicklow county hurling team